The Magic of Believing is the tenth studio album by American singer Dionne Warwick. It was released in 1968 on Scepter Records special for Easter. The singer recorded this album entirely in the genre of gospel music.

Track listing

Charts

References

Dionne Warwick albums
1968 albums
Scepter Records albums